Lukáš Mihálik (born 12 February 1994) is a Slovak football forward who currently plays for FC Jois in Austria.

Career

Club career
He made his debut for FC ViOn Zlaté Moravce against FK Dukla Banská Bystrica on 16 May 2012.

References

External links

Ligy.sk profile
Eurofotbal.cz profile
Lukáš Mihálik at ÖFB

1994 births
Living people
Slovak footballers
Slovak expatriate footballers
Association football forwards
FC ViOn Zlaté Moravce players
Slovak Super Liga players
Slovak expatriate sportspeople in Austria
Expatriate footballers in Austria